The 7th Infantry Division was a formation of the Ottoman Turkish Army, during the Balkan Wars, and the First World War.

Formation
19th Infantry Regiment
20th Infantry Regiment
21st Infantry Regiment
7th Artillery Regiment

References

 Bean, Charles (1941). Official History of Australia in the War of 1914–1918. Volume II (11th ed.). Brisbane: University of Queensland Press. .

Military units and formations of the Ottoman Empire in the Balkan Wars
Military units and formations of the Ottoman Empire in World War I
Infantry divisions of the Ottoman Empire